Cassidy may refer to:

Personal names
 Cassidy (given name)
 Cassidy (surname)

People
 Cassidy (musician) (born 1979), lead singer of Antigone Rising
 Cassidy (rapper) (born 1982), American rapper
 DJ Cassidy (born 1981), New York DJ
 James Cipperly also known as Orange Cassidy (born 1984), AEW Professional Wrestler

Fictional 
 Cole Cassidy, a fictional character in the Blizzard Entertainment's 2016 video game Overwatch
 Cassidy (DC Comics), a vampire from the graphic novel Preacher
 Cassidy, role played by actor Sam Slovick in the television show Fame
 Charles Parnell Cassidy, a fictional premier of New South Wales in the novel and TV film Cassidy

Companies
 Casady & Greene, software company (1984–2003) that produced software for the Macintosh

Other
 Cassidy, British Columbia, a settlement and airport in Canada
 Maggie Cassidy, a 1959 novel by Jack Kerouac
 Cassidy's Ltd., a defunct Canadian company
 "Cassidy" (song), a 1972 song by the Grateful Dead
Cassidy (miniseries), a 1989 Australian miniseries based on a 1986 novel by Morris West

See also
 Cassady (disambiguation)